Asscher may refer to:

 Royal Asscher Diamond Company, a Dutch diamond-cutting company and inventor of the Asscher cut

People
 Abraham Asscher (1880–1950), Dutch Jewish businessman
 Lodewijk Asscher (born 1974), Dutch politician
 William Asscher (1930-2014), consultant nephrologist, active on the United Kingdom
 Jane Asscher (1963-Present), CEO of 23Red

See also
 Asher, the second son of Jacob and Zilpah in the Book of Genesis